Anti-Terrorism Squad (ATS) is a special police force in several states of India including Maharashtra, Gujarat, Kerala, Uttar Pradesh, Rajasthan, Bihar, Jharkhand and West Bengal. In Maharashtra, it is headed by senior of the Indian Police Service. The squad has stopped several terrorist attacks in the country including 1991 Lokhandwala Complex shootout & 26/11 Mumbai attacks.

ATS was founded in Maharashtra in 1990 by then Additional Commissioner of Police, Mumbai Aftab Ahmed Khan (popularly known as A. A. Khan). He was inspired by the Los Angeles Police Department's Special Weapons & Tactics (SWAT) teams methods to combat modern-day terrorism. Since its formation in 1990, ATS's officers have won 23 gallantry awards. The Mumbai ATS was involved in the 26 November 2008 hostage rescue operations in multiple locations in Mumbai, Maharashtra including the 5 star hotels Taj, Oberoi and Trident.

Termination and reformation
The ATS was formed in December 1990 and helped reduce the crime rate in Mumbai by 70%. However, there were many human rights violations by the squad, from extreme means of torture to public shootings. Following the 1991 Lokhandwala Complex shootout on 16 November 1991 and many more encounters, the organization was terminated in January 1993. The leader of this program, A.A. Khan, was transferred as the IGP Anti Naxalite division to Nagpur on 29 January 1993 following the termination of the program. One month later on 12 March 1993 the Bombay blasts occurred, and the crime rate has increased since then.

As per the information available on the official website of Mumbai Police, ATS was created by the Government of Maharashtra, vide G.R. No. SAS-10/03/15/SB-IV,
dated 8 July 2004. The stated objectives of ATS are:

 To gain information about anti-national elements working in any part of Maharashtra
 To co-ordinate with central information agencies like the IB and R&AW and exchange information with them
 To co-ordinate with similar agencies of other states
 To track and eliminate activities of mafias,gangsters and other organized crime syndicates
 To detect rackets of counterfeit currency notes and smuggling narcotic substances

Branches
Several states in India have created ATS units in their respective police forces, including :
 Maharashtra
 Gujarat
 Lucknow, Uttar Pradesh
 Kerala
 Rajasthan
 Bihar
 Madhya Pradesh
 West Bengal

1991 shootout at Lokhandwala

On 16 November 1991 the ATS Chief, A.A. Khan, lead a squad of officers into the Swati building in Lokhandwala, eliminating 7 gangsters including Maya Dolas and Dilip Buwa. The shootout lasted 4 hours and more than 450 rounds were fired.

November 2008 Mumbai attacks
The former ATS Chief Hemant Karkare was killed fighting terrorists on 26 November 2008, at the Cama & Albless Hospital in the Dhobitalao area of Mumbai. Karkare was killed with other two officers: Additional Commissioner Ashok Kamte and encounter specialist Vijay Salaskar. He was among the 14 police officials killed while fighting terrorists in Mumbai.

The terrorists had holed up in many heritage locations of Mumbai, such as the Taj Mahal Palace Hotel and the Oberoi and Trident, Nariman Point hotels. Here the terrorists had killed 146 people, wounded at least 327, and taken at least 15 people hostage. Indians accounted for 96 dead of those, and at least 300 of those injured.

Karkare, a 1982 batch IPS officer, had returned to his state cadre after a seven-year tenure with the Research and Analysis Wing, India's external intelligence agency, in Austria.

References

External links
 Maharashtra ATS
Uttar Pradesh ATS

Maharashtra Police
People associated with the 2008 Mumbai attacks
1991 Lokhandwala Complex shootout
Counterterrorism in India
Encounters in India
Non-military counterterrorist organizations